Ado Reinvald (3 December 1847 Viljandi Parish, Viljandi County – 8 February 1922) was an Estonian poet.

He was the owner of Ilissa farm near Tarvastu. Because of initiative of Reinvald, the farm was transformed to the local cultural centre. In 1894, the centre went bankrupt.

Reinvald died in 1922 and is buried at Raadi Cemetery in Tartu.

Several Reinvald's poems have been set to music. The most notable is "Kuldrannake" ('Golden Strand'), music by Aleksander Läte.

Works
 poetry collection "Villandi laulik" ('The Bard of Viljandi'; I 1872, II 1875, III 1877, IV 1889) 
 poetry collection "Õitsi Ööpik" ('The Nightingale of Night Herd'; 1876)
 poetry collection "Nalja-Kannel ehk Laulurahe Baltlaste lilliaias" (I 1881, II 1883)
 humour book "Suur Naljahammas" ('The Great Joker'; 1903)

References

1847 births
1922 deaths
Estonian male poets
19th-century Estonian poets
20th-century Estonian poets
People from Viljandi Parish
Burials at Raadi cemetery